Rufus A. Doughton (January 10, 1857 – August 17, 1946) was an American politician who served as a member of the North Carolina General Assembly from Alleghany County, North Carolina, and as speaker of the state House of Representatives for one term (1891).

Early life and education 
Doughton was one of twelve children of J.H. and Rebecca Doughton of Laurel Springs, North Carolina. All twelve went to college. Rufus attended the University of North Carolina at Chapel Hill.

Career 
A Democrat, he was elected and served as the seventh lieutenant governor of North Carolina from 1893 to 1897 under Governor Elias Carr. He played an important role in establishing the road system in North Carolina. In 1896, Doughton ran unsuccessfully for the U.S. House of Representatives, losing to Romulus Z. Linney.

Doughton was later elected to the state House again, serving in the 1909, 1911, and 1913 sessions. He also served as secretary of the North Carolina Department of Revenue for several periods.

Personal life
Doughton's family home is now a bed and breakfast called Doughton Hall. His brother, Robert L. Doughton, served in the U.S. House of Representatives for many years (1911–1953) and helped write the Social Security Act. Robert chaired the House Ways and Means Committee for many years, longer than any other congressman. A book called Hillbilly Women includes a story of a poor woman whose family needed money to bury a relative and walked over the ridge to ask "Rufe Doughton" for help.

Doughton and his wife, Sue Parks, had two children. His son, James Kemp Doughton, also served in the state legislature and as speaker of the House.

References

1857 births
1946 deaths
People from Alleghany County, North Carolina
Lieutenant Governors of North Carolina
Speakers of the North Carolina House of Representatives
Democratic Party members of the North Carolina House of Representatives
University of North Carolina at Chapel Hill alumni
Doughton family
State cabinet secretaries of North Carolina